Suntar-Khayata Range is a granite mountain range rising along the border of the Sakha Republic in the north with Amur Oblast and Khabarovsk Krai in the south.

The R504 Kolyma Highway passes through the northern part of the range by Kyubeme.

Geography
The Suntar-Khayata is approximately 450–550 km long and 60 km wide.  high Mus-Khaya Mountain, located in the Sakha Republic, is the highest point of the range.

The Suntar-Khayata Range is geographically a southeastern prolongation of the Verkhoyansk Range. Until mid 20th century it was treated as a separate range, together with the Skalisty Range, highest point , and the Sette Daban, highest point , to the southwest. The Yudoma-Maya Highlands are located to the south of the range and the Upper Kolyma Highlands to the northeast.

Subranges
The Suntar-Khayata system comprises a number of subranges, including the Khalkan Range, Net-Taga Range, Yudoma Range and Kukhtuy Range.

Hydrography
The Suntar-Khayata is a watershed divide between the Aldan River, of the Lena basin, and the Indigirka —both of the Arctic Ocean, and the Sea of Okhotsk. 

Some of the major watercourses having their source in the range are the Tyry, Tompo, Allakh-Yun and Yudoma belonging to the Lena basin, the Khastakh, Kuydusun and Taryn-Yuryakh to the Indigirka basin, the Kulu of the Kolyma River basin, while the Okhota, Ulbeya, Inya, Kukhtuy and Yana  flow into the Sea of Okhotsk. 

The range includes the southernmost glaciers in the Russian Far East outside of Kamchatka. Their status is not known.

Geology
The strata of this geological formation date back to the Late Jurassic. Dinosaur remains are among the fossils that have been recovered from the formation.

Flora and fauna
The higher slopes of the range are sparsely wooded, with mainly larch forests and tundra.

A small population of Brown Dippers (Cinclus pallasi) winters at a hot spring in the Suntar-Khayata Range. The birds feed underwater when air temperatures drop below .

Vertebrate paleofauna
Indeterminate Carnosauria remains, possible indeterminate Coelurosaur remains, indeterminate Sauropoda remains that had been previously referred to Camarasauridae indet, and indeterminate Theropoda remains have all been recovered from Suntar outcrops in Sakha Republic, Russia.

See also
Lists of dinosaur-bearing stratigraphic units
List of ultras of Northeast Asia
Oymyakon Highlands

Notes

External links

Geology of Russia
Jurassic paleontological sites